Cookpad Inc. (TYO: 2193) is a food tech company. The company operates "Cookpad" which is Japan’s largest recipe sharing service, with 60 million monthly unique users in Japan and 40 million monthly unique users globally, allowing visitors to upload and search through original, user-created recipes. The firm established its global headquarters in Bristol, UK, and is expanding its business into international markets with offices in the UK, Spain, Indonesia, Lebanon, Brazil, India, Taiwan, Hungary, Greece, Russia and elsewhere. As of 2021, its sites draw around 800 million page views each month. It went public on the Tokyo Stock Exchange in July 2009. As of December 2018, Cookpad had more than 5 million registered recipes.

History 
 October 1997: Coin Ltd. established (The predecessor to COOKPAD Inc.)
 March 1998: Launched “Kitchen@coin” as a sharing service for cooking
 June 1999: Changed the service name to “COOKPAD”
 March 2002: Started advertising business
 September 2004: Launched premium service business
 September 2006: Launched the mobile service “MOBAREPI”
 November 2008: Launched MOBAREPI’s premium service 
 July 2009: Listed on TSE Mothers 
 March 2010: Opened an office in California, USA 
 May 2011: Opened an office in Singapore
 June 2016: Acquired Cucumbertown
 October 2017: Opened an office in Bristol, UK

References

External links 

Japan’s Cookpad Recipe Site Sizzles in Stock Debut (Update1)
A Recipe Site Goes IPO, In Japan (Cookpad)
Official Polish site
Official Russian site
Official US site
Official Japanese site

Companies established in 1997
Companies listed on the Tokyo Stock Exchange
Internet technology companies of Japan